Ralph Banks (20 June 1920 – 1 October 1993) was an English footballer.

He played for Bolton Wanderers from 1940 to 1954, although for the first years of his career he fought in the Second World War and, after the cessation of hostilities, was called up for national service. He played over a hundred games for the club, mostly at left back, and came up against Stanley Matthews in the 1953 FA Cup Final, which turned out to be his last game for the club. After leaving Bolton, he played for a season and a half at Aldershot before retiring.

Banks' younger brother Tommy Banks also played for Bolton Wanderers. Ralph Banks died in Bolton in 1993.

References

English footballers
Bolton Wanderers F.C. players
Aldershot F.C. players
English Football League players
Association football fullbacks
People from Farnworth
1920 births
1993 deaths
FA Cup Final players
20th-century British military personnel